In the 1853 Chicago mayoral election, Charles McNeill Gray defeated Josiah L. James in a landslide, winning by a 54 point margin. 

Incumbent mayor Walter S. Gurnee did not run for reelection.

The election was held on March 14.

Josiah L. James was a businessman in the lumber industry.

Results

References

1853
Chicago
Chicago
1850s in Chicago